The She language (Mandarin: 畲語, Shēyǔ, Hakka 山客話, san ha ue), autonym Ho Ne,  or Ho Nte, is a critically endangered Hmong–Mien language spoken by the She people. Most of the over 709,000 She people today speak Shehua (probably a variety of Hakka Chinese). Those who speak Sheyu—approximately 1,200 individuals in Guangdong Province—call themselves Ho Ne, "mountain people".

Dialects
There are two main dialects of She, both of which are highly endangered. They are spoken in two small pockets to the west and east of Huizhou City, Guangdong.
Luofu 罗浮 (Western She dialect), spoken in Luofu Mountain District 罗浮山区, Boluo County and in Zengcheng District. 580 speakers according to Ethnologue.
Lianhua 莲花 (Eastern She dialect), spoken in Lianhua Mountain District 莲花山区, Haifeng County. 390 speakers according to Ethnologue.

External relationships
She has been difficult to classify due to the heavy influence of Chinese on the language. Matisoff (2001), for example, left it unclassified within the Hmongic languages, and some have considered that much to be doubtful, leaving it unclassified within (and potentially a third branch of) the Hmong–Mien languages. She has monosyllabic roots, but has mainly compound words. However, due to the similar components of She, Mao & Li (2002) and Ratliff (2010) consider She to be most closely related to Jiongnai.

She is not to be confused with Shēyǔ (畲语) is Shēhuà (meaning 'She dialect' or 'She speech'), an unclassified Sinitic language spoken by the She people of Fujian and Zhejiang provinces. Shehua and Sheyu speakers have separate histories and identities, although both are officially classified by the Chinese government as She people. The Dongjia of Majiang County, Guizhou are also officially classified as She people, but speak a Western Hmongic language closely related to Chong'anjiang Miao (重安江苗语).

Phonology

Consonants

Glottal stop is not distinct from zero (a vowel-initial syllable).

There are consonant mutation effects. For instance, pǐ + kiáu becomes pi̋’iáu, and kóu + tȁi becomes kóulȁi.

Vowels

Tones
She has six tones, reduced to two (high and low) in checked syllables (Hakka loans only). There is quite a lot of dialectical variability; two of the reported inventories (not necessarily in corresponding order) are:

: that is, /5 4 3 2 1 35/, or (on ), 

: that is, /53 42 3 2 31 35/

Vocabulary

Old Chinese loanwords
As with the Southern Chinese languages, She has various loanwords from Old Chinese.
走 to run
行 to walk
烏 black
赤 red
寮 house
禾 rice (plant)
鑊 wok
奉 to give
其 he/she/it
着 to wear
睇 to  look
戮 to kill
齧 to bite
使 to use

References

Citations

Sources 

 
 
 
 

Hmongic languages
Languages of China
Critically endangered languages
She people